are megalithic tombs or tumuli in Northeast Asia. Kofun were mainly constructed in the Japanese archipelago between the middle of the 3rd century to the early 7th century CE.

The term is the origin of the name of the Kofun period, which indicates the middle 3rd century to early–middle 6th century. Many kofun have distinctive keyhole-shaped mounds. The Mozu-Furuichi kofungun or tumulus clusters were inscribed on the UNESCO World Heritage List in 2019, while Ishibutai Kofun is one of a number in Asuka-Fujiwara residing on the Tentative List.

Overview 
The kofun tumuli have assumed various shapes throughout history. There are also circular-type, "two conjoined rectangles" typed, and square-type kofun. Orientation of kofun is not specified. For example, in the Saki kofun group, all of the circular parts are facing north, but there is no such formation in the Yanagimoto kofun group. Haniwa, terracotta figures, were arrayed above and in the surroundings to delimit and protect the sacred areas.

Kofun range from several metres to over 400 m long. The largest, which has been attributed to Emperor Nintoku, is Daisen Kofun in Sakai City, Osaka Prefecture.

The funeral chamber was located beneath the round part and comprised a group of megaliths. In 1972, the unlooted Takamatsuzuka Tomb was found in Asuka, and some details of the discovery were revealed. Inside the tightly assembled rocks, white lime plasters were pasted,  and colored pictures depict the 'Asuka Beauties' of the court as well as constellations. A stone coffin was placed in the chamber, and accessories, swords, and bronze mirrors were laid both inside and outside the coffin. The wall paintings have been designated national treasures and the grave goods as important cultural property, while the tumulus is a special historic site.

Locations and number
Kofun burial mounds and their remains have been found all over Japan, including remote islands such as Nishinoshima.

A total of 161,560 kofun tomb sites have been found as of 2001. Hyōgo Prefecture has the most of all prefectures (16,577 sites), and Chiba Prefecture has the second most (13,112 sites).

History

Yayoi period
Most of the tombs of chiefs in the Yayoi period were square-shaped mounds surrounded by ditches. The most notable example in the late Yayoi period is Tatetsuki Mound Tomb in Kurashiki, Okayama. The mound is about 45 metres wide and 5 metres high and has a shaft chamber. Broken pieces of Tokushu-kidai, cylindrical earthenware, were excavated around the mound.

Another prevalent type of Yayoi period tomb is the Yosumi tosshutsugata funkyūbo, a square mound with protruding corners. These tombs were built in the San'in region, a coastal area off the Sea of Japan. Unearthed articles indicate the existence of alliances between native tribes in the region.

Early Kofun period

One of the first keyhole-shaped kofun was built in the  area, the southeastern part of the Nara Basin. Hashihaka Kofun, which was built in the middle of the 3rd century AD, is 280 metres long and 30 metres high. Its scale is obviously different from previous Yayoi tombs. During the next three decades, about 10 kofun were built in the area, which are now called as the Makimuku Kofun Group. A wooden coffin was placed on the bottom of a shaft, and the surrounding walls were built up by flat stones. Finally, megalithic stones formed the roof. Bronze mirrors, iron swords, magatama, clay vessels and other artifacts were found in good condition in undisturbed tombs. Some scholars assume the buried person of Hashihaka kofun was the shadowy ancient Queen Himiko of Yamataikoku, mentioned in the Chinese historical texts. According to the books, Japan was called Wa, which was the confederation of numerous small tribes or countries. The construction of gigantic kofun is the result of the relatively centralized governmental structure in the Nara Basin, possibly the origin of the Yamato polity and the Imperial lineage of Japan.

Mid-Kofun period
During the 5th century AD, the construction of keyhole kofun began in Yamato Province; continued in Kawachi, where gigantic kofun, such as Daisen Kofun of the Emperor Nintoku, were built; and then throughout the country. The proliferation of keyhole kofun is generally assumed to be evidence of the Yamato court's expansion in this age. However, some argue that it simply shows the spread of culture based on progress in distribution, and has little to do with a political breakthrough.

A few tombs from the mid-Baekje era were excavated around the Yeongsan River basin in South Korea. The design of these tombs are notably different. The tombs that were discovered on the Korean peninsula were built between the 5th and 6th centuries CE. There remain questions about who were buried in these tombs such as nobility, aristocracy, warriors or mercenaries.

Late Kofun period
Keyhole-shaped kofun disappeared in the late 6th century AD, probably due to the drastic reformation in the Yamato court, where Nihon Shoki records the introduction of Buddhism during this era.

UNESCO Kofun Group
This list includes the "Mozu-Furuichi Kofun Group: Mounded Tombs of Ancient Japan", which was inscribed as a UNESCO World Heritage Site on 6 July 2019.

Aerial photos

See also

William Gowland, a British engineer who made the first survey for Saki kofun group
Ernest Satow, a British diplomat who wrote about kofun in Kozuke for the Asiatic Society of Japan
 Fukiishi, stones used to cover kofun
 Kofun system

Notes

References
飛鳥高松塚 (Takamatsuzuka, Asuka), 橿原考古学研究所編, 明日香村, 1972.
前方後円墳 (Keyhole-shaped kofun), 上田宏範,  学生社, 東京, 1969.
前方後円墳と古代日朝関係 (Keyhole-shaped kofun and diplomatic relations between ancient Japan and Korea), 朝鮮学会編, 東京, 同成社, 2002.

External links

 Kofun - World History Encyclopedia
 Japanese Archaeology: Kofun Culture
  Decorated Kofun Database
 Comprehensive Database of Archaeological Site Reports in Japan, Nara National Research Institute for Cultural Properties

 
Archaeology of death
Asuka period
Culture articles needing translation from Japanese Wikipedia
Kofun period
Mounds
Nara period
World Heritage Sites in Japan